Sultan Zainal Abidin Shah ibni Almarhum Sultan Mahmud Shah (died 1555) was the seventh Sultan of Pahang who reigned from 1540 to 1555. He succeeded on the death of his elder brother in 1540.

Personal life
Known as Raja Zainal before his accession, Zainal Abidin Shah was the younger son of the fifth Sultan of Pahang, Mahmud Shah by his first wife, Raja Putri Olah binti al-Marhum Sultan Ahmad. He was married first to his second cousin, Raja Putri Dewi, daughter of Mahmud Shah of Melaka by a Kelantanese princess, Putri Onang Kening. He had four children from this marriage, two sons, Raja Mansur, and Raja Jamal, and two daughters, Puteri Khalijah and Puteri Bongsu. Zainal Abidin's second wife was a non-royal, Tun Gemala, daughter of his Bendahara, Seri Buana. By her, he had a son Raja Abdul Kadir. In addition he had eighteen children by his junior wives and concubines. Puteri Khalijah married her first cousin Raja Mahmud, son of Alauddin Riayat Shah II of Johor. This prince settled in Pahang and died there.

Reign
The reign of Sultan Zainal Abidin saw the renewed attempts by the rump state of Melaka based in Johor to retake the city of Melaka, under the leadership of Alauddin Riayat Shah II of Johor. In 1547, a combined forces from Johor, Pahang and Perak, consisting three hundred sail and eight thousand men were assembled in the Muar river. The real objective of the large Malay force were unknown but the Portuguese Malacca was informed that the fleet were in preparation to attack Aceh Sultanate. The Portuguese grew suspicious, thinking the real intention was to attack Melaka. Thus, a Portuguese plan to assemble a very large fleet to intercept the Malay forces were leaked, prompting the dispersal of the Malay forces in the Muar river. Few years later in 1550, another attempt on Melaka was made by the combined forces of Johor, Pahang and Perak. Rumours spread that the Portuguese warships so harried the harbours of Pahang that the Pahang fleet had to retreat to defend their own capital. In the face of superior Portuguese arms and vessels, the combined Malay forces were forced to retreat.

Death
Sultan Zainal Abidin died about 1555 and was posthumously styled Marhum di Bukit ('the late ruler who was buried on the hill'). It may be that he was buried in Makam Nibong, on top of a hill in Pekan Lama, the ancient name for which was Makam Tembuni ('the graveyard of the cauls'). He was succeeded by his eldest son, Raja Mansur.

References

Bibliography
 
 
 
 
 
 

1555 deaths
16th-century Sultans of Pahang